Drish may refer to:

River Drish, a river in the Republic of Ireland
Dr. John R. Drish House, a historic mansion in Tuscaloosa, Alabama